Jiangwan (usually, literally "river bend") is a common place name in China:

Township-level units 
 Jiangwan, Harbin, town in Yilan County
 Jiangwan, Guangdong, town in Wujiang District, Shaoguan
 Jiangwan, Jiangxi, town in Wuyuan County (:zh:江湾镇 (婺源县))
 Jiangwan Township, Dorbod Mongol Autonomous County, Heilongjiang
 Jiangwanzhen Subdistrict, a.k.a. Jiangwan Town Subdistrict (:zh:江湾镇街道), formerly (until 2006) Jiangwan Town, in Shanghai

Transportation 
 Jiangwan Airport, former airport in Shanghai
 Jiangwan Town Station in Shanghai Metro
 Jiangwan Stadium Metro Station in Shanghai Metro
 Jiangwan Bridge, in Guangzhou, Guangdong

Other
 Riverside Sports Center, also known as Shanghai Jiangwan Sports Center, in Shanghai

Not to be confused with
 Jiangwang Subdistrict (蒋王街道), in Yangzhou City, Jiangsu